The 1925 Austin Kangaroos football team was an American football team that represented Austin College as a member of the Texas Intercollegiate Athletic Association (TIAA) during the 1925 college football season. Led by Pete Cawthon in his third season as head coach, the team compiled an overall record of 4–4–1 with a mark of 2–3 in TIAA play. The team's captain was Adam Cone.  Eddie Dyer and Dell Morgan were assistant coaches.  Henry Frnka played halfback.

Schedule

References

Austin
Austin Kangaroos football seasons
Austin Kangaroos football